Cinci Hoca (literally "hoca of jinn") is the epithet of Karabaşzade Hüseyin Efendi, a 17th-century Ottoman spiritualist whose influence on the sultan caused many problems in the empire.

Life 
He was born in Safranbolu (in modern province of Karabük, Turkey). According to Joseph von Hammer, he was a descendant of Sadrettin Konevi, a 13th-century Sufi. But unlike his famous ancestor, he made a name as a witch doctor and valide sultan (mother sultana)  Kösem invited him to the palace to cure the unbalanced sultan İbrahim. In 1643, İbrahim appointed Cinci as the kadı of Galata and in 1644 as the kazasker of Anatolia  an appointment which caused a great reaction among the ulama.

Influence
Cinci used his increasing power to increase his wealth by accepting bribes. He was instrumental in executing the able grand vizier Kemankeş Mustafa Pasha in 1644. Seeing the end of his predecessor, the new grand vizier Sultanzade Mehmet Pasha became a very ineffective statesman.

Death
When İbrahim was dethroned in 1648, the new grand vizier Sofu Mehmet Pasha faced the problem of bonus salaries, the traditional salary paid to soldiers upon the enthronement of the new sultan. He confiscated Cinci's earnings and expelled Cinci to Damascus (now in Syria). But during his travel, Cinci fell ill in Mihalcık (now Karacabey in Bursa Province, Turkey). While staying in Mihalcık, he criticised the grand vizier and consequently he was executed.

References 

Hoca, Cinci
Hoca, Cinci
1648 deaths
Hoca, Cinci
Hoca, Cinci
Hoca, Cinci
Hoca, Cinci
People from Safranbolu